Paul Webb (born June 29, 1929) is an American former college basketball coach. He was the head coach at Randolph–Macon College from 1956 to 1975 and at Old Dominion University from 1975 to 1985.

He played basketball and baseball for the College of William & Mary from 1947 to 1951.

References

External links
 Old Dominion University Hall of Fame profile

1929 births
Living people
American men's basketball coaches
American men's basketball players
Basketball coaches from Virginia
Basketball players from Virginia
Old Dominion Monarchs men's basketball coaches
Randolph–Macon Yellow Jackets men's basketball coaches
William & Mary Tribe baseball players
William & Mary Tribe men's basketball players